In patent law, industrial design law, and trademark law, a priority right or right of priority is a time-limited right, triggered by the first filing of an application for a patent, an industrial design or a trademark respectively. The priority right allows the claimant to file a subsequent application in another country for the same invention, design, or trademark effective as of the date of filing the first application. When filing the subsequent application, the applicant must claim the priority of the first application in order to make use of the right of priority. The right of priority belongs to the applicant or his successor in title.

The period of priority, i.e., the period during which the priority right exists, is usually 6 months for industrial designs and trademarks and 12 months for patents and utility models. The period of priority is often referred to as the priority year for patents and utility models.

In patent law, when a priority is validly claimed, the date of filing of the first application, called the priority date, is considered to be the effective date of filing for the examination of  novelty and inventive step or non-obviousness for the subsequent application claiming the priority of the first application. In other words, the prior art which is taken into account for examining the novelty and inventive step or non-obviousness of the invention claimed in the subsequent application would not be everything made available to the public before the filing date (of the subsequent application) but everything made available to the public before the priority date, i.e. the date of filing of the first application.

Rationale 

The "basic purpose [of the right of priority] is to safeguard, for a limited period, the interests of a patent applicant in his endeavour to obtain international protection for his invention, thereby alleviating the negative consequences of the principle of territoriality in patent law."

Types

Convention priority right 

The "Paris Convention priority right", also called "Convention priority right" or "Union priority right", is a "priority right" under a multilateral arrangement, defined by Article 4 of the Paris Convention for the Protection of Industrial Property of 1883. The Convention priority right is probably the most widely known priority right. It is defined by its Article 4 A.(1):

Article 4 B. of the Paris Convention describes the effects of the priority right:

Article 2 paragraph 1 of the WTO Agreement on Trade-Related Aspects of Intellectual Property Rights (TRIPs Agreement) in conjunction with the Paris Convention provides a "derived" Convention priority right. That is, while WTO members need not ratify the Paris Convention, they should however comply with Articles 1 through 12, and Article 19, of the Paris Convention. (For a comparative list of the States party to the Paris Convention and the members of the WTO, see for instance States Party to PCT/Paris/WTO] on the WIPO web site).

Priority rights under other multilateral arrangements 
Some priority rights are defined by a multilateral convention such as the European Patent Convention (EPC) or the Patent Cooperation Treaty (PCT). The Paris Convention does not cover priorities claimed in a European patent application or in an international application (or PCT application), as the EPC and the PCT have their own legal provisions regarding priority.

European Patent Convention 

 defines the priority right system under the EPC or more precisely recognise priority rights for first filings in or for States party to the Paris Convention or any Member of the World Trade Organization (WTO):

 describes the effect of the priority right:

As explained by the Enlarged Board of Appeal of the European Patent Office (EPO) in its decision G 3/93 of August 16, 1994 (Reasons 4):

According to Enlarged Board of Appeal opinion G 2/98, the requirement for claiming priority of "the same invention" means that priority of a previous application in respect of a claim in a European patent application is to be acknowledged only if the skilled person can derive the subject-matter of the claim directly and unambiguously, using common general knowledge, from the previous application as a whole.

Patent Cooperation Treaty 

The Patent Cooperation Treaty, in its Article 8(1), provides the possibility of claiming a right of priority for the filing of an international application (PCT application):

 goes on to mention that:

However, Rule 4.10(a) as amended with effect from January 1, 2000 does not apply to all designated Offices. For instance, for the European Patent Office as designated Office, the old Rule 4.10(a) still applied until December 12, 2007, that is, rights of priority of first applications made in a WTO member not party to the Paris Convention were not recognised. Now and more specifically for European patent applications filed on or after December 13, 2007 (the entry into force of the new version of the European Patent Convention, the so-called EPC 2000), the rights of priority of first applications made in a WTO member are recognized under the European Patent Convention.

Internal priority rights 
Some priority rights, called "internal priority rights", are defined by some national laws. Such internal priority right allows an applicant who filed a first application in a given country to claim the priority of the first application when filing a subsequent application in the same country. The Paris Convention does not cover internal priority rights.  See, e.g., provisional application in the US.

Priority rights under bilateral agreements 
Some priority rights also exist on the basis of bilateral agreements. A bilateral agreement between a first and a second country may allow an applicant who filed an application in the first country to claim the priority of the first application when filing a second application in the second country. These kinds of bilateral agreements usually involve at least one country not party to the Paris Convention.

Example 

An example may help to understand the legal concept of priority right. The example presented here illustrates the case of the priority right in patent law, but the example could be extended to trademarks, taking into account the difference of priority period (12 months for patents, 6 months for trademarks).

 
Let us imagine the following scenario. Ms. A has invented an improved mousetrap and decides to apply for a patent on her mousetrap. She first files a German patent application on July 15, 2006. Starting from July 16, 2006, Ms. A has then one year to file patent applications in other countries to be able to benefit from the date of filing of the German patent application in these other countries. If Ms. A files on July 15, 2007 a patent application in the United Kingdom (UK) for her mousetrap, and if, upon filing the patent application in the United Kingdom, Ms. A claims the priority of the earliest German patent application filed one year before, the date for examining the novelty and inventive step requirements in the United Kingdom will be July 15, 2006, not July 15, 2007.

This means that any disclosure to the public of the improved mousetrap on or after July 15, 2006 (by Ms. A or anyone else) will not prejudice Ms. A's patent application in the United Kingdom. If Mr. B independently invents around January 2007 the same improved mousetrap and decides to directly publish in February 2007 a paper explaining how his new mousetrap works, the publication of the paper by Mr. B will not affect the novelty of Ms. A's patent application in the United Kingdom, even though the publication of Mr. B's paper takes place before the actual date of filing of Ms. A's UK patent application.

The priority system, including this one-year priority right, enables Ms. A to file a patent application as soon as possible in one country (in this case in Germany, and in the German language), and gives her one-year to do whatever is necessary to file patent applications in other countries (translating the text of the application, filling the application forms, sending the translated application and forms to the foreign patent offices, collecting the funds to pay the filing fees, and so on) without being affected by any intervening publication. The actual date of filing in the United Kingdom remains July 15, 2007, and this is the date from which the 20-year duration of any ensuing patent is calculated.  The example also applies to many other countries, such as to all countries which are party to the Paris Convention.

Special considerations

Partial priority for patent claims 
The extent to which a partial priority can be acknowledged for a single claim in a patent application or patent -i.e., only for a part of the claim, for which the subject-matter is disclosed in the priority document- is a delicate question. Decision G 1/15 of the Enlarged Board of Appeal of the EPO deals specifically with this question.

Extension of the priority period in case of official holidays and other "closed" days 
The Paris Convention for the Protection of Industrial Property of 1883 provides for that, if the last day of the 12-month priority period "is an official holiday, or a day when the Office is not open for the filing of applications in the country where protection is claimed", the priority period is extended "until the first following working day".

See also
 WIPO DAS, a system for exchanging priority documents electronically

References

Further reading 
  Reinhard Wieczorek, Die Unionspriorität im Patentrecht: Grundfragen des Artikels 4 der Pariser Verbandsübereinkunft, C. Heymanns, 1975  
  Oliver Ruhl, Unionspriorität : Art. 4 PVÜ und seine Umsetzung im amerikanischen, europäischen und deutschen Patentrecht, Heymann, 2000 
 Decision G 3/02 of 26 April 2004 of the Enlarged Board of Appeal of the European Patent Office 

Intellectual property law
Patent law
Trademark law